Tapellariopsis is a genus of lichenized fungi in the family Pilocarpaceae. This is a monotypic genus, containing the single species Tapellariopsis octomera.

References

Pilocarpaceae
Lichen genera
Monotypic Lecanorales genera
Taxa named by Robert Lücking
Taxa described in 1999